Kerstin Tzscherlich (born 15 February 1978 in Freital) is a volleyball player from Germany. She played as a libero for the German Women's National Team since 1997.

She represented her native country in two consecutive Summer Olympics, starting in 2000. She played at the 2002 FIVB Volleyball Women's World Championship in Germany. On club level she played with Dresdner SC.

She is 179 cm tall, and nicknamed "Tzscherli".

Honours
 1998 World Championship — 13th place
 1999 European Championship — 4th place
 2000 Olympic Games — 6th place
 2001 European Championship — 9th place
 2002 FIVB World Grand Prix — 3rd place
 2002 World Championship — 10th place
 2003 European Championship — 3rd place
 2004 Olympic Games — 9th place
 2005 FIVB World Grand Prix — 10th place
 2005 European Championship — 11th place
 2006 World Championship — 11th place
 2007 European Championship — 6th place
 2009 FIVB World Grand Prix — 3rd place

Awards

Individuals
 2008 Montreux Volley Masters "Best Digger"
 2009 World Grand Prix "Best Libero"
 2009 European Championships "Best Receiver"

References

External links 
  DVV Profile

1978 births
Living people
German women's volleyball players
Volleyball players at the 2000 Summer Olympics
Volleyball players at the 2004 Summer Olympics
Olympic volleyball players of Germany
People from Freital
Sportspeople from Saxony
20th-century German women
21st-century German women